Leif Gunnar Smerud (born 24 January 1977 in Stavanger) is a Norwegian football manager, psychologist and former player. He has held the position of Head Coach of the Norwegian U21 National Team since 2014. In June 2022 he qualified the U21-Norway National Team, as only the third coach in Norways history, to the U21 Euro. The U21 EURO is held in Romania and Georgia from 21th of June to July 8th.

BACKGROUND 
Leif Gunnar Smerud has a Cand.Psych degree from Copenhagen University, and is a licensed clinical psychologist. He also studied at The Norwegian School of Sports Science. He holds a UEFA-Pro-license, and has been working as Deputy Technical Director in the Norwegian FA.

PLAYING CAREER 
Smerud is born in Stavanger, started playing for Våganes, but soon went to Vidar F.K., where he made his first team debut aged 15. He made the national team U15 i 1992, and played both U18 Euro 1995 and for the U21-team.

Helped by former coach legend Kjell Schou-Andreassen, he left his youth club Vidar, after two promotions and two relegations in four years, for Lillestrøm SK in 1997. He played in several positions during all his career. After Lillestrøm he played for Viking FK, where Benny Lennartson and Bjarne Berntsen identified a talent for coaching, and gave him the position as Head Coach for the Jr-elite team in 2002, whilst playing. After Viking he went to Mandalskammeratene and FC Lyn Oslo, before retiring at the age of 28.

COACHING CAREER 
Smerud first Head Coach position came for Hønefoss BK in 2011 in OBOS-ligaen. He promoted them in his first year, an accomplishment for which he was awarded the Young Coach of the Year award in Norway. He led Hønefoss in Eliteserien in 2012 and 2013, before starting his work as U21-National Team coach in 2014. He has also won a UEFA EURO bronze medal as assistant coach for the Norwegian Women´s National Team, in 2009. He was the interim manager for the same team in 2016. He made headlines in Norway when he became Manager for "Nødlandslaget", the Norwegian National Team in Nations League, in november 2020. When the regular coaching staff was quarantined, he was asked to gather and lead a team in a decisive game against Austria. The team became national heros, despite a draw 1-1.

NORWAY U21 
After being close a couple of times before, Smerud managed to succeed in qualifying the Norway U21 team, with players like Erik Botheim and Jørgen Strand Larsen, born 2000, to the Euro in June 2022. After 7 games, Norway had to win all the last 3 games, Croatia (home), Finland (away) and Azerbaijan (home) to win the group. In the last game Erik Botheims goal in the 77th minute was decisive, and sent Norway to only their third Euro in history. Only two other coaches have qualified Norway, Nils Johan Semb (1998) and Tor Ole Skullerud (2013).

References

External links
Profile at Altomfotball.no 
Profile at lynfotball.net 

1977 births
Living people
Sportspeople from Stavanger
Norwegian footballers
FK Vidar players
Lillestrøm SK players
Viking FK players
Mandalskameratene players
Lyn Fotball players
Eliteserien players
Association football midfielders
Norwegian football managers
Hønefoss BK managers
Norway women's national football team managers
Norway national football team managers
Eliteserien managers